Józef Fontana II (born 1676 in Mendrisio, Canton of Ticino, died 1739 in Warsaw) was a Swiss Italian Polish architect and the father of architects, Jakub Fontana and Jan Kanty Fontana.

His works show a tendency towards classical baroque.

Major projects and works 
 Piarist church and monastery in Szczuczyn (with Józef Piola – the start of his career as construction manager)
 Church in Sidra 1705–1783 (with Józef Piola),
 Church of John of God and monastery of Merciful Brothers in Warsaw (with Antonio Solari)
 Church of St Francis in Warsaw (with son Jakub)
 Bieliński Palace in Warsaw (before 1730, demolished in 1895)
 Kozłówka Palace
 Bieliński Palace in Otwock Wielki (collaboration), 
 Work on the last stage of construction of the Holy Cross Church, Warsaw
 Façade of the Field Cathedral of the Polish Army in Warsaw
 Reconstruction of the Potocki Palace on Krakowskie Przedmieście in Warsaw
 Work on Wilanów Palace
 Plans for conversion of Kazimierz Palace into a barracks (1732, together with Colonel Jauch)
 Reconstruction of Primate's Palace, Warsaw
 Palace in Obroshyne

Architects from Ticino
Architects from Warsaw
1676 births
1741 deaths
People from Mendrisio
18th-century Polish–Lithuanian architects